Several theorems are named after Karl Weierstrass. These include:
The Weierstrass approximation theorem, of which one well known generalization is the Stone–Weierstrass theorem
The Bolzano–Weierstrass theorem, which ensures compactness of closed and bounded sets in Rn
The Weierstrass extreme value theorem, which states that a continuous function on a closed and bounded set obtains its extreme values
The Weierstrass–Casorati theorem describes the behavior of holomorphic functions near essential singularities
The Weierstrass preparation theorem describes the behavior of analytic functions near a specified point
The Lindemann–Weierstrass theorem concerning the transcendental numbers
The Weierstrass factorization theorem asserts that entire functions can be represented by a product involving their zeroes
The Sokhatsky–Weierstrass theorem which helps evaluate certain Cauchy-type integrals

See also 

 List of topics named after Karl Weierstrass